"Your Love" is the debut single recorded by rapper Nicki Minaj, taken from her debut studio album Pink Friday (2010). It was released on June 1, 2010 by Young Money, Cash Money, and Universal Motown as the lead single of the album. The song was written by Minaj, Joseph Hughes, David Freeman, and Andrew "Pop" Wansel, and was produced by the latter. Minaj originally intended to release "Massive Attack" as the lead single from Pink Friday, though its release was scrapped after an underwhelming commercial performance.

Described as a "rap ballad", the song is a change of tempo compared to Minaj's previous work, and according to Mariel Concepcion of Billboard, the song contains a "new brand of hood majesty". The song samples Annie Lennox's 1995 cover version of the song "No More I Love You's" (1986) by The Lover Speaks, using its background vocals with additional bass, hip-hop backbeats and drum loops added. The song peaked at numbers 14 and four on the US Billboard Hot 100 and Hot R&B/Hip-Hop Songs charts, respectively. As of June 2016 the song has sold 1.5 million digital downloads.

Background

The first version of "Your Love" appeared on Nicki Minaj's unofficial mixtape Barbie World (2010), with different lyrics included in the pre-chorus along with a faster pace. Another version was later stolen and leaked online. The song underwent minor lyrical adjustments and mixing before being sent to mainstream radio, as the first official single from Minaj's debut album Pink Friday (2010). In an interview with Hot 93.7 radio, Minaj spoke about the leak of the song, saying "That was a leak and I was so upset they put it out 'cause I recorded that song like two years ago. Next thing you know, people started falling in love with it." Whilst on set on the music video for "Your Love", Minaj further explain about the song's theft and leak, saying, "I was not planning on putting the song out at all. But then I heard it one day, somebody told me it was online. And I was like, 'No way, no way in the world that song is out.' I went and listened to it and was really upset. It wasn't mixed, it wasn't finished, it wasn't anything — I wasn't gonna use it at all. But then radio started playing it."

Rap-Up posted cover art featuring a close up of Minaj smirking to her right, however for unknown reasons the art work was changed. The new cover features a cartoon version of Minaj, made by illustrator Asia Kendrick-Horton who posted it for Minaj on Twitter.

Composition

"Your Love" is a mid-tempo song with the heavy use of Auto-Tune in the chorus. It samples the instrumentals and background vocals of Annie Lennox's cover version of "No More I Love You's" by the Lover Speaks, with the addition of additional bass, drum-loops and hip-hop backbeats. According to the sheet music published at Musicnotes.com by Sony/ATV Music Publishing, "Your Love" is set in common time with a metronome of 94 beats per minute. It is composed in the key of E major with Minaj's vocal range spanning from the low-note of B3 to the high-note of C5.

The conception of Your Love was a series of accidents. Pop had made the beat in his mother's basement. Pop’s sister Jackie was a big fan of Annie Lennox and recommended sampling No More I Love You's. Despite his disdain for the song, one day while Jackie was cleaning Pop heard the song again and the concept for Your Love was established. He went back to the basement and looped the sample, adding a kick and snap. While sending Minaj some beats over email, Pop accidentally attached the Your Love instrumental. He texted her right after, saying it was an accident, but to his surprise she liked the record and recorded on it. After recording on it the song went into limbo for 2 years, until someone at Hot Beats Studio in Atlanta leaked it online. Nicki was horrified because of the how public might have reacted to her Auto-Tune quality. Hoping the leak would be forgotten, it instead went on to surpass the initial single Massive Attack which had been a commercial flop. The leaked unmastered demo started to chart. Along with Pop's partner Oak they replayed the sample because Annie Lennox would not allow the sample to be cleared, then rerecording Nicki's vocals for the new version of the beat which replaced the demo on the charts. 

The official remix featuring Cash Money labelmate Jay Sean was leaked via-internet on August 2, 2010, and later made available for purchase in Australia via iTunes. American rapper Flo Rida released an unofficial remix to the song, in which he adds a verse. Reggae recording artist Sean Paul also did a remix to the song where he ad-libs his verse throughout the original and later adds his own verse. Other remixes to the song include those done by American rapper Rick Ross and American R&B singer Chris Brown.

Critical reception
Sara D. Anderson of AOL Radio Blog described the song as a "rap/singing mash-up". Coined as a "new brand of hood majesty", the song is accompanied by a simple beat, which includes finger snaps and "xylophone clings". Lean Greenblatt of Entertainment Weekly commented: "Rap's spitfire explores her softer side, sampling Annie Lennox on her honey-tongued ode to a good man." Greenblatt went on to compare the song to Jay-Z's "kindred" "Young Forever". Minaj makes several references in her lines to well known people, which includes Bruce Willis in Die Hard, as well as Adam and Eve. Minaj makes several connections to Superman including in the pre-chorus, "'S' on my chest, let me get my cape on." 

Rap-Up stated that Minaj "slows down her rapid-fire verses on the sticky and sweet "Your Love" ... with a sprinkling of Auto-Tune to top it off. Young Money's First Lady even exercises her vocal chops. We demand another helping." Robbie Daw of Idolator gave the song a positive review, while complimented Minaj's dual rapping and singing, as well as the use of the sample. Backy Bain also of Idolator additionally gave the song a positive review stating "We were a bit worried that Harujuku Barbie would forever be the garnish on other people's tracks instead of the main dish, but this sweet song proves otherwise." Mariel Concepcion of Billboard commented on Minaj toning it down stating, "the Young Money rap princess puts the sleazy talk aside and finds herself smitten with a young man... Minaj proves that even the wildest ones can be tamed." While reviewing the music video, Brad Wete also of Entertainment Weekly reviewed the song positively, stating that Minaj was "slicing the competition to pieces with her second try". David Jeffries of AllMusic deemed the song an album highlight, additionally adding that the song, "waltzes out of the speakers". In 2014, Pitchfork named it the best Nicki Minaj single.

Alexis Petridis of The Guardian discussed the song's position on the album, stating that as the album progresses, Minaj turns into "devoted girlfriend material". Margaret Wappler of the Los Angeles Times gave a mixed review of the song, stating, "It's just another fantasy clattering around the head of this Queens-bred imagineer of urban music whose sense of identity is so whimsically schizoid that she makes Lady Gaga seem as fixed as Barbara Bush." Allison Stewart of The Washington Post complimented Minaj's singing on the track, stating that the song was "so shamelessly sweet it's as if replaced Minaj with Rachel McAdams, but it's a great song, and another example of Minaj trying on and ultimately discarding various personas the way Lady Gaga does platform shoes. She tries on voices, too, taking a scenic tour of Queens, London and Trinidad before settling on a Jamaican patois." Stewart went on to name the song a recommended download from the album.

Chart performance
"Your Love" debuted on the US Billboard Hot 100 at 51, becoming Minaj's first song to chart on the Hot 100 as a solo artist. It eventually peaked at No. 14, becoming her first Top 20 in the country. It debuted at No. 23 on the US Hot R&B/Hip-Hop Songs chart, and peaked at number four. Your Love" peaked at No.  1 on the US Rap Songs chart for eight consecutive weeks. Minaj became the first female rapper to top the chart since Lil' Kim's "Magic Stick", featuring 50 Cent. Minaj also became the first artist to lead the chart with a song without any features since Missy Elliott in 2003 with "Work It". The song was certified platinum by the Recording Industry Association of America (RIAA) denoting sales of over one million copies. On the Canadian Hot 100, the song peaked at 43. "Your Love" also charted in the United Kingdom, at a peak of 71 on the UK Singles Chart and at a peak of 22 on the UK R&B Chart. The song peaked at number 32 on the Australian Urban Singles chart.

Music video

Background
A music video for the song was directed by Director X on the weekend of July 4, 2010 in Los Angeles. Minaj took to her Twitter, asking fans who they would like to see portray her love interest in the video. Minaj was interviewed on the set of "Your Love" by MTV News while wearing a pink and purple kimono as a geisha for the video. In the interview, Minaj said, "We wanted to have geisha themes, samurai themes, stuff like that. I wanted to tell a love story. It's just kinda liking a guy, where he's not really for you to like—the forbidden fruit—and me and this other girl happen to like him and we go to war." The video premiered July 21, 2010 on MTV.com. Actor Michael Jai White portrays Minaj's love interest in the video.

Synopsis
The video is set to tell the story of a samurai-in-training, who falls in love with her master while a jealous peer fights for his affection. The video begins with Minaj delivering her lines over a red flowing fabric backdrop wearing a brown coat and a geisha costume with a blue flowing fabric backdrop, while White teaches a martial arts class. As Minaj and the instructor (White) begin to fall for one another, a student, who also has feelings for the instructor sees this and is jealous. This is intercut with scenes with Minaj donning a blonde wig and black bodysuit and in front of a green flowing backdrop. After seeing Minaj and White embrace each other on a bridge over blue-fabric "water", Minaj and her peer rival have a confrontation, which results in a duel. According to MTV News, the scenes pay homage to Uma Thurman as The Bride and Lucy Liu as Cottonmouth in Kill Bill. Minaj loses and her rival walks away as Minaj bleeds a red fabric and White walks up and grieves over her body.

Critical reception
Robbie Daw of Idolator appreciated the plot twist of the video, commenting, "We really expected Nicki to waste that other warrior-in-training hater. The fact that she dies—and does so in such a beautiful way here—kind of makes us love her all the more." Daw also inferred that the fancy attire from the "No More I Love You's" video inspired Minaj's in the "Your Love" video. Nicole Sia of MTV Buzzworthy stated that the video resembles Crouching Tiger, Hidden Dragon in its fight scene. Sia also commented on Minaj's appearance stating "the camera cuts to Ms. Young Money soloing in front of billowing one-million-thread-count satin sheets, just to remind us how damn FINE she is." Tray Hova of Vibe gave a list of the best and worst parts of the music video, stating the best were Minaj chopped through the blocks of cement, her crazy faces, silk sheets and headgear, and that the worst part was the "melodramatic ending" and "the return of those Freddy Krueger fingers".

Credits and personnel
Songwriting – Onika Maraj, Warren "Oak" Felder, Andrew "Pop" Wansel, David Freeman, Joseph Patrick Hughes
Recording/Mixing – Ariel Chobaz, assisted by Lyttleton "Cartwheel" Carter
Mixing – Neal Pogue
Production – Pop Wansel, Oak Felder

Credits are taken from the Pink Friday liner notes.

Charts and certifications

Weekly charts

Year-end charts

Certifications

Radio dates and release history

References

2010s ballads
2010 singles
Nicki Minaj songs
Songs written by Nicki Minaj
Cash Money Records singles
Music videos directed by Director X
Songs written by Pop Wansel
2010 songs
Song recordings produced by Pop & Oak
Annie Lennox
Contemporary R&B ballads